The Roman Catholic Church in Mexico comprises eighteen ecclesiastical provinces each headed by an archbishop. The provinces in turn comprise 18 archdioceses, 69 dioceses, and 5 territorial prelatures and each headed by a bishop (of some kind).

List of Dioceses

Ecclesiastical province of Acapulco 
 Archdiocese of Acapulco
 Diocese of Chilpancingo-Chilapa
 Diocese of Ciudad Altamirano
 Diocese of Tlapa

Ecclesiastical province of Antequera, Oaxaca 
 Archdiocese of Antequera, Oaxaca
 Diocese of Puerto Escondido
 Diocese of Tehuantepec
 Diocese of Tuxtepec
 Prelature of Huautla
 Prelature of Mixes

Ecclesiastical province of Chihuahua 
 Archdiocese of Chihuahua
 Diocese of Ciudad Juárez
 Diocese of Cuauhtémoc-Madera
 Diocese of Nuevo Casas Grandes
 Diocese of Parral
 Diocese of Tarahumara

Ecclesiastical province of Durango 
 Archdiocese of Durango
 Diocese of Mazatlán
 Diocese of Torreón
 Diocese of Gómez Palacio
 Prelature of El Salto

Ecclesiastical province of Guadalajara 
 Archdiocese of Guadalajara
 Diocese of Aguascalientes
 Diocese of Autlán
 Diocese of Ciudad Guzmán
 Diocese of Colima
 Diocese of San Juan de los Lagos
 Diocese of Tepic
 Prelature of Jesús María del Nayar

Ecclesiastical province of Hermosillo 
 Archdiocese of Hermosillo
 Diocese of Ciudad Obregón
 Diocese of Culiacán
 Diocese of Nogales

Ecclesiastical province of Jalapa (Xalapa) 
 Archdiocese of Jalapa (Xalapa)
 Diocese of Coatzacoalcos
 Diocese of Córdoba
 Diocese of Orizaba
 Diocese of Papantla
 Diocese of San Andrés Tuxtla
 Diocese of Tuxpan
 Diocese of Veracruz

Ecclesiastical province of León 
 Archdiocese of León
 Diocese of Celaya
 Diocese of Irapuato
 Diocese of Querétaro

Ecclesiastical province of México 
 Archdiocese of Mexico
 Diocese of Azcapotzalco
 Diocese of Iztapalapa
 Diocese of Xochimilco

Ecclesiastical province of Monterrey 
 Archdiocese of Monterrey
 Diocese of Ciudad Victoria
 Diocese of Linares
 Diocese of Matamoros
 Diocese of Nuevo Laredo
 Diocese of Piedras Negras
 Diocese of Saltillo
 Diocese of Tampico

Ecclesiastical province of Morelia 
 Archdiocese of Morelia
 Diocese of Apatzingan
 Diocese of Ciudad Lázaro Cárdenas
 Diocese of Tacámbaro
 Diocese of Zamora

Ecclesiastical province of Puebla de los Angeles 
 Archdiocese of Puebla de los Angeles
 Diocese of Huajuapan de León
 Diocese of Tehuacán
 Diocese of Tlaxcala

Ecclesiastical province of San Luis Potosí 
 Archdiocese of San Luis Potosí 
 Diocese of Ciudad Valles
 Diocese of Matehuala
 Diocese of Zacatecas

Ecclesiastical province of Tijuana 
 Archdiocese of Tijuana
 Diocese of Ensenada
 Diocese of La Paz en la Baja California Sur
 Diocese of Mexicali

Ecclesiastical province of Tlalnepantla 
 Archdiocese of Tlalnepantla
 Diocese of Cuautitlán
 Diocese of Ecatepec
 Diocese of Netzahualcóyotl
 Diocese of Texcoco
 Diocese of Valle de Chalco
Diocese of Izcalli

Ecclesiastical province of Toluca 
 Archdiocese of Toluca
 Diocese of Atlacomulco de Fabela
 Diocese of Cuernavaca
 Diocese of Tenancingo

Ecclesiastical province of Tulancingo 
 Archdiocese of Tulancingo
 Diocese of Huejutla
 Diocese of Tula

Ecclesiastical province of Tuxtla Gutiérrez 
 Archdiocese of Tuxtla Gutiérrez
 Diocese of San Cristóbal de Las Casas
 Diocese of Tapachula

Ecclesiastical province of Yucatán  
 Archdiocese of Yucatán 
 Diocese of Campeche
 Diocese of Tabasco
 Diocese of Cancún-Chetumal

Gallery of Episcopal Sees

References

External links
GCatholic.org.

Catholic Church in Mexico

Mexico
Catholic dioceses